SW5 may refer to:

SW postcode area
Earl's Court, a district in the Royal Borough of Kensington and Chelsea in central London
 SW5 tram, a class of electric trams, some built by the Melbourne & Metropolitan Tramways Board, but most modified from the W2 tram by the Metropolitan Transit Authority.
Star Wars Episode V: The Empire Strikes Back, a 1980 American epic space opera film directed by Irvin Kershner
Fernvale LRT station, Singapore

See also
 S5W
 SWV (disambiguation)
 SW (disambiguation)